The Curious Dr. Humpp, locally released as La venganza del sexo (Spanish for "revenge of sex"), is a 1969 Argentine sexploitation horror film written and directed by Emilio Vieyra.  It focuses on a mad scientist who kidnaps people and forces them to have sex, which he views as the lifeblood of humanity, so that he can create a way for humans to attain eternal life.

Plot
People engaged in sex—Rachel and her boyfriend, four hippies, two lesbians, and a woman with photos of naked men—are systematically kidnapped by a hideous monster and taken away by hearse. George, a newspaper reporter, and Police Inspector Benedict investigate. A barman remembers seeing the monster at his club just before the stripper was abducted. The police sketch is published in the paper and the monster is spotted trying to buy aphrodisiacs at a pharmacy. George follows the hearse and is captured trying to break into the estate where everyone is being held.

George wakes to find himself a prisoner, too. He is befriended by Rachel, who helps him overpower Dr. Humpp's Nurse. After George has sex with the Nurse, she agrees to help him escape, but is that just a ploy? Dr. Humpp is trying to give mankind eternal life using the power of the human libido. Can he succeed?

Cast
 Ricardo Bauleo as Horacio Funes (George)
 Gloria Prat as Raquel (Rachel)
 Aldo Barbero as Dr. Zoide (Dr. Humpp)
 Susana Beltrán Enfermera (Nurse)
 Héctor Biuchet as Inspector Benedict

Release

Home media
The film was released on DVD by Image Entertainment on October 3, 2000. It was later released by Odeon on May 23, 2005. In 2021 it released a new Blu-ray release under the Vinegar Syndrome partner label AGFA also known as American Genre Film Archive.

Reception

Upon its 1971 release in Buenos Aires, the film was generally poorly received by local film critics. A reviewer from La Prensa found it puerile and a poor representative of Argentine cinema.

TV Guide awarded the film one out of five stars, calling the film "morbid". Dave Sindelar from Fantastic Movie Musings and Ramblings noted the film's "silly" dialogue", surreal aspects, and overuse of stock footage, stating that the film was "for the adults only crowd".

References

External links 
 
 
 

1969 films
1960s exploitation films
1960s science fiction horror films
1969 horror films
Argentine science fiction films
Argentine horror films
Films shot in Buenos Aires
1960s Spanish-language films
1960s Argentine films

Films directed by Emilio Vieyra